The 1977 NAIA Division I football season was the 22nd season of college football sponsored by the NAIA, was the eighth season of play of the NAIA's top division for football.

The season was played from August to November 1977 and culminated in the 1977 NAIA Division I Football National Championship. Known this year as the Apple Bowl, the title game was played on December 10, 1977 at the Kingdome in Seattle, Washington. Abilene Christian defeated Southwestern Oklahoma State in the Apple Bowl, 24–7, to win their second NAIA national title.

Conference realignment

Conference changes
 This is the final season that the NAIA officially recognizes a football champion from the Mid-Eastern Athletic Conference.

Membership changes

Conference standings

Conference champions

Postseason

See also
 1977 NAIA Division II football season
 1977 NCAA Division I football season
 1977 NCAA Division II football season
 1977 NCAA Division III football season

References

 
NAIA Football National Championship